Countess Margit Teleki de Szék (2 December 1860 – 26 January 1922) was a Hungarian noblewoman, wife of Prime Minister Károly Khuen-Héderváry.

Family
She was born into a wealthy aristocrat Transylvanian family in 1860 as the third child of Sándor (1829–1875) and Jozefina Teleki (1838–1915). One of her brothers was József, a Member of Parliament.

Margit Teleki married Khuen-Héderváry on 6 September 1880. They had two children: Sándor (1881–1946) and Károly the Younger (1888–1960).

She died on 26 January 1922 in Budapest, four years after her husband's death.

References

Sources
Margit Teleki de Szék
Vasárnapi Újság 1903/27

1860 births
1922 deaths
Hungarian nobility
Margit